is a Japanese motorcycle racing manga written and illustrated by Kaoru Shintani. It received the 1984 Shogakukan Manga Award for shōnen manga. The series focuses on Sawatari Taka and Toujou Taka as they compete with each other and other competitors in motorcycle racing. Their names means "hawk" and "falcon", respectively.

The manga was adapted as a 36 episode anime series broadcast on Fuji TV between September 20, 1984, and June 21, 1985. The anime premiered in France on March 11, 1990, and was released on La Cinq and Mangas. Only 32 were aired in France.

This was one of the last series to be animated by Kokusai Eiga-sha.

Plot
When Taka Sawatari and his mother were heading home after having dinner, they were attacked by a motorcycle gang. They got saved by a mysterious young man. The next day, Sawatari learned that that young man was a professional racer who has the same first name, Taka Toujou. In a race, Sawatari loses control when entering a curve, nearly killing Toujou. After the event, the two become rivals as they compete against each other with their racing skills.

Characters

Main characters

Guest appearances
Pops Yoshimura and David Aldana made some celebrity appearances throughout the series.

Anime
Music for the series was composed by Joe Hisaishi.

References

External links
 

1981 manga
1984 anime television series debuts
Fuji TV original programming
Kaoru Shintani
Motorsports in anime and manga
Shogakukan franchises
Shogakukan manga
Shōnen manga
Animated television series about auto racing
Winners of the Shogakukan Manga Award for shōnen manga